DeValls Bluff School District No. 1 (DVBSD) was a school district headquartered in DeValls Bluff, Arkansas. It had two schools: Devalls Bluff Elementary School and Devalls Bluff High School. The mascot was the scrapper.

The DeValls Bluff district consolidated into the Hazen School District on July 1, 2006.

References

External links
 
 DeValls Bluff School District No. 1 Prairie County, Arkansas General Purpose Financial Statements and Other Reports June 30, 2002 

2006 disestablishments in Arkansas
School districts disestablished in 2006
Defunct school districts in Arkansas
Education in Prairie County, Arkansas